François Dagognet (24 April 1924 – 3 October 2015) was a 20th-century French philosopher.

François Dagognet was born in Langres. He studied both science and philosophy, and was a student of Georges Canguilhem. He was Professor of Philosophy at the University of Lyon before becoming Professor of Philosophy at Pantheon-Sorbonne University.

Dagognet wrote extensively on the philosophy of the body.

Works
 Philosophie biologique. Paris: PUF, 1955.
 La Raison et les remèdes, essai sur l’imaginaire et le réel dans la thérapeutique contemporaine. Paris: PUF, 1964
 Gaston Bachelard: sa vie, son oeuvre, avec un exposé de sa philosophie. Paris: PUF, 1965.
 Sur Lavoisier, Cahiers pour l’Analyse, vol. 9 (1968)
 Tableaux et langages de la chimie. Paris: Éditions du Seuil, 1969.
 Écriture et iconographie. Paris: Vrin, 1974.
 Pour une théorie générale des formes. Paris: Vrin, 1975.
 Philosophie de l’image. Paris: Vrin, 1986.
 Le Cerveau citadelle. Le Plessis-Robinson: Les Empêcheurs de penser en rond, 1992.
 Etienne-Jules Marey : a passion for the trace, New York: Zone Books, 1992.
 Georges Canguilhem, philosophe de la vie. Le Plessis-Robinson: Les Empêcheurs de penser en rond, 1997.
 Le Nombre et le lieu. Paris: Vrin, 2000.
 Faces, Surfaces, Interfaces. Paris: Vrin, 2003.
 L’Animal selon Condillac: une introduction au Traité des animaux de Condillac. Paris: Vrin, 2004.

References

External links
 François Dagognet (1924–2015)

1924 births
2015 deaths
20th-century French philosophers
21st-century French philosophers
French male non-fiction writers
People from Langres
Academic staff of the University of Lyon